Stuart White may refer to:
 Stuart White (educator)
 Stuart White (recording engineer)
 Stuart White (cricketer)